Shingave is a village in Rahata taluka of Ahmednagar district in the Indian state of Maharashtra. It is one of the largest village by area in Rahata.

Location
Shingave is situated on the bank of Godavari river in the northern region of Ahmednagar District and Rahata taluka.

Puntamba, Pimpalwadi, Sade, Rui and Wari are the nearby villages to Shingave. Shirdi, Rahata and Kopargaon are the nearby cities.

Demographics

Population
The population of Shingave village is 4258 as of the 2011 census. Males constitute 2194 whereas females constitute 2064.

Literacy
Literacy rate of village is 67.52% which is below national and state average rates .

Economy

Agriculture is a backbone of a village. Most of the people are farmers who are engaged farming and allied work like Dairy farming, Goat farming. Many youths are employed in near city Shirdi. Some people are marginal workers.
Following table shows crops cultivated in village.

Education
Shingave has three Zilla Parishad primary schools and one secondary school.

 Primary schools
 ZP School (Central location)
 ZP School (West region)
 ZP School (East region)
 Secondary school
 Shringeshwar Madhyamik Vidyalaya

Transport

Road
Shingave is connected to nearby cities and villages by state highway (SH 36) and other rural roads. State highway connects Shingave to Kopargaon, Puntamba and Shrirampur, rural roads to Pimpalwadi, Rui, Wari and Shirdi.

Rail
Shingave is served by nearby Shirdi, Puntamba and Kanhegaon railway stations.

Air
Shirdi Airport is the nearest airport to village at distance of 25 km.

Gallery

See also
List of villages in Rahata taluka

References 

Villages in Ahmednagar district